Glebe of Westover Parish is a historic home located near Ruthville, Charles City County, Virginia. It built about 1745, as a -story, five-bay brick building, with an early 19th-century rear ell. It reflects Colonial and Federal style design elements. It also has an early 20th-century, one-story, frame wing.  It was built as a glebe house for Westover Parish. The house was sold into private hands after the 1807 act of the General Assembly requiring the sale of all Virginia glebes.

It was added to the National Register of Historic Places in 1975.

References

External links
 Glebe House, State Route 615 vicinity, Charles City, Charles City, VA at the Historic American Buildings Survey (HABS)

Houses on the National Register of Historic Places in Virginia
Houses completed in 1745
Houses in Charles City County, Virginia
National Register of Historic Places in Charles City County, Virginia
Historic American Buildings Survey in Virginia
1745 establishments in Virginia